Live at Shea Stadium is a live album by the English punk rock band The Clash. It was recorded at Shea Stadium in New York City on 13 October 1982, the band's second night opening for The Who; the concert was produced by Kosmo Vinyl. The album features Terry Chimes on drums instead of Topper Headon, who was fired for heroin abuse earlier in the year. The original recordings were unearthed by Clash frontman Joe Strummer while packing for a move. The album was released in the United Kingdom on 6 October 2008 and in the United States the following day.

Reception

Reception for Live at Shea Stadium was very positive. Review aggregator Metacritic, which collates reviews from various publications, indicates a score of 81 (indicating "Universal acclaim").

Track listing

Film footage
The performances of "Career Opportunities" and "Should I Stay Or Should I Go" are widely available.  On 11 December 2020, during a Q&A celebrating the debut of his music video for "The Magnificent Seven", Don Letts confirmed that only "Career Opportunities" and "Should I Stay or Should I Go" were filmed. The Who's headline performance was released on DVD in 2015.

Personnel
 Joe Strummer - lead vocals, rhythm guitar, bass on "The Guns of Brixton"
 Mick Jones - guitar, vocals
 Paul Simonon - bass, backing vocals, lead vocals and rhythm guitar on "The Guns of Brixton"
 Terry Chimes - drums

Production
 Glyn Johns - original recording
 David Bates; Mark Frith - restoration, mixing
 Tim Young - master recording
 Bob Gruen; Joe Stevens - photography

Charts

References

External links
 Live at Shea Stadium - The Sunday Times review
 Live at Shea Stadium - Rolling Stone review
 Another memento from Shea Stadium: recording of 1982 Clash concert by The Canadian Press

The Clash live albums
2008 live albums
Epic Records live albums